Grace Growden Galloway (1727–1782) was the wife of loyalist Joseph Galloway. She nearly lost everything in the aftermath of the American Revolution. Grace Galloway's property was confiscated because of the political position of her husband. This loss of property led to the loss of her social standing and pride. Grace Galloway notably left a detailed diary documenting her daily life and her fight to regain her property. This diary has been a strong source for historians to learn from and grasp what it was like to be a female loyalist. Galloway's diary provides a fresh perspective into a side of the Revolutionary War that was previously often omitted from history.

Early life 
In 1727, Grace Growden (later Galloway) was born in Pennsylvania. Her father, Lawrence Growden, had an immense amount of power and respect through his business  interests and great wealth, possessing such luxuries as a four-wheeled coach. Lawrence Growden was the proprietor of Durham Iron Furnace and held a position on the Pennsylvania assembly; in addition he owned ten thousand acres of land. Galloway was thus raised with an immense amount of privilege, but she was not necessarily happy. Despite her father's wealth and  power, Grace's childhood was lonely and filled with egotistical men.

In 1753, Grace Galloway married Joseph Galloway. Joseph quickly gained prominence as a lawyer and soon became one of the most powerful politicians in Pennsylvania. When Grace's father died, Joseph inherited Grace's share of her father's property: Trevose (Growden Mansion), Belmont, Richlieu, King's Place, and Durham Lands. Joseph and Grace had four children, but only their daughter, Elizabeth (Betsy), survived to adulthood.

Before and during the American Revolution 
Before the American Revolution, Grace Galloway was one of the most prominent figures in Pennsylvania society, in part because Joseph Galloway, a strong loyalist, held a continuous seat in the assembly from 1757 to 1776 (except for 1764) and served as the Speaker of the House from 1766 to 1775. Their social standing began to decline when it became clear the British were losing the war, but the Galloways remained true to their loyalist commitments even in a society that was highly revolutionist. Joseph was removed from the speakership and became a public example that loyalism would not be tolerated in the new age. As the war started going poorly for the British, Joseph and daughter Elizabeth sought protection with the British, leaving Grace behind to defend and reclaim the family land. Grace never saw her husband or daughter again. Grace's continued loyalist beliefs and the fact that Joseph had abandoned her made her a social pariah. Grace worried that the family names of Galloway and Growden were being ruined. Grace recounted in her diary: "No one will take me in and all the men keep away from me... I am fled from as pestilence". This was especially hard for Grace because she had enjoyed such status for all of her life to that point.

Diary 
Grace Growden Galloway began to keep a diary the day after Joseph fled with the British evacuation. The diary began as a way for her to keep her husband up to date on her daily activities, but after three weeks it became a way for her to record her feelings, conversations, and activities. She used the diary to record things that she could not say in public. The diary became an autobiography and a way to document how she was trying to regain her daughter Betsy's inheritance. The diary opens by describing her treatment by the Commissioners of Forfeited Estates (how they were confiscating loyalist lands). The chief justice had ordered the land that the Galloways inherited to be confiscated. Grace used the diary as a place to claim the land as her own – she did not refer to it as Joseph's or the commissioners', although technically it belonged to Joseph Galloway. Grace claimed that the land was willed to her, and despite the fact that she could not own land singularly, she had told Joseph to keep her name on the property deed. However, Joseph had not complied with this request: he had signed the deed but left out Grace's name.

Overall, the diary matches well with the complaints of other loyalist women about being left behind.

Post-Revolution 
When the rebels ascended to power, Grace Growden Galloway lost her property, carriage, and status—but still considered herself superior. Galloway would not move out of her house, so the Supreme Executive Council decided to move a new tenant in. When she still refused to move, they changed the locks on her doors. She was physically removed by force. At this point, Grace began to advocate very strongly that the Galloway estate was hers and that she should not be punished for the mistakes her husband made. Historian Carol Berkin claims, "Grace Galloway sought to separate her fate from her husband's, to demand that the punishment meted out to him for his actions fall on him alone." She lost this battle. While marriage and feme covert (married women whose legal rights were absorbed by those of their husband's) left Grace without legal rights, politics had erased her social standing. After the revolution, Grace felt that she was not only being stripped of her property but also her social standing. She was ashamed to go to Polly Wharton to ask for transportation and boarding and further humiliated. Even more so when her request was denied. She describes the same in her diary: "My heart was ready to burst at the mean figure I must cut in begging to go to another persons house & be told I cou'd Not ... I was so Mortified & Troubled that 1 cou'd not sleep all Night".

Finally, Galloway was invited to buy back her own property on January 30, 1779, and even allowed to put it in her name. However, if she were to make this deal, she would be legally and politically "uncovered" and liable to be charged with treason. Grace Galloway discussed the debate in her diary, "First, shou'd I Claim & they Grant me the whole I then made Myself a subject to the state & owning their Authority subject Myself to All the Penalties of their Laws & there by banish myself from my husband & Child or render Myself liable to an Attainder". In addition, Galloway would have to pay taxes which would go against her conscience since the money would go to the Rebels' military. Galloway decided to be neither a Loyalist or a Rebel so that she would not have to take her property back in the way that was offered. When Galloway died in 1782, she willed her estate to her daughter, Betsy. Legally, Grace had no right to do so since technically it was owned by the Supreme Executive Council. After the Treaty of Paris was signed in 1783, parts of the property were returned to Betsy, and after Joseph Galloway's death, the Pennsylvania Supreme Court ruled that Grace should not have been punished for Joseph's wrongdoings. Consequently, they returned the full estate to Betsy and Grace's heirs. The estate has now been turned into a museum operated by the Historical Society of Bensalem Township in Pennsylvania. The estate is open to visitors.

Further reading 
As a female loyalist, Grace Galloway has been of interest to many authors discussing feme covert. In addition, Grace Galloway's diary has provided the perspective of women who supported the English, and in turn, were punished. Works that have drawn on Galloway's diary include:

References

External links
 

1727 births
1782 deaths
18th-century American writers
18th-century American women writers
American Revolutionary War Diarists
Loyalists in the American Revolution from Pennsylvania
Upper class culture in the United States
American diarists
Writers from Pennsylvania
American women non-fiction writers
18th-century diarists